Mike Gibson (27 May 1940 – 23 September 2015), often also known by the nickname "Gibbo", was an Australian sports journalist, columnist, commentator, and radio and television presenter.

Media career
Gibson began his media career as a print journalist covering greyhound racing and rugby league. He moved to the 2SM radio breakfast show in the 1970s before going to 2GB in 1979. He began hosting Wide World of Sports in 1981. He also wrote a regular column for The Australian Women's Weekly, having previously written columns for two Sydney daily newspapers. He co-hosted Good Morning Australia with Kerri-Anne Kennerley for several years from 1988.
He was an original presenter of the Nine Network's program Nine's Wide World of Sports, opposite Australian cricket captain Ian Chappell. He hosted The Back Page, with friend and comedian Billy Birmingham, on Fox Sports for 16 years. Birmingham parodied Gibson on the program in a segment called "The Wired World of Sports".

In 2007, he was awarded Australian Sports Commission Media Awards Lifetime Achievement Award.

Gibson retired in 2013.

Personal life and death
Gibson separated from his wife, Helen, in 1989 and was the father of five children, including Courtney Gibson, who had also worked at the Nine Network.

Gibson, aged 75, committed suicide at his home on the Central Coast, New South Wales, on the morning of 23 September 2015 after a long period of depression.

References

1940 births
2015 suicides
Suicides in New South Wales
Australian columnists
Australian television presenters
Australian rugby league commentators
Nine's Wide World of Sport
Australian radio personalities
2015 deaths